Lešje is a settlement on the left bank of the Dravinja River west of Majšperk in northeastern Slovenia. The area is part of the traditional region of Styria. It is now included with the rest of the Municipality of Majšperk in the Drava Statistical Region. The valley is dominated by meadows and fields, which are used for livestock and agriculture.

References

External links
Lešje at Geopedia

Populated places in the Municipality of Majšperk